Madeleine Mary Zeien Bordallo (born May 31, 1933) is an American-Guamanian politician who served as the delegate to the U.S. House of Representatives for  from January 3, 2003 to January 3, 2019.

She is the first woman ever to serve as Guam's Delegate, the first female Lieutenant Governor of Guam (from 1995 to 2003), the first female candidate for Governor of Guam (in 1990), and the first female Democrat elected to the Legislature of Guam. Her 1990 campaign also made her the first non-Chamorro gubernatorial candidate in Guam. As the wife of Ricardo Bordallo, she was also the First Lady of Guam from 1975 to 1979 and from 1983 to 1987.

Biography

Madeleine Mary Zeien was born on May 31, 1933 in Graceville, Minnesota, to a family of educators who moved to Guam after her father took a job with the Guam Department of Education. She attended St. Mary's College in Notre Dame, Indiana, and the College of St. Catherine in St. Paul, Minnesota, where she studied music. In the 1950s and 1960s, Bordallo was a television presenter for KUAM-TV, the NBC affiliate that was the first television station on Guam.

Bordallo was married to Ricardo Bordallo, who served as Governor of Guam from 1975 to 1979 and from 1983 to 1987. While serving as first lady, she worked to emphasize the arts in the classroom and to increase awareness of the local Chamorro culture. Bordallo's husband, the former governor, committed suicide in 1990 when his appeals were unsuccessful and convictions of witness tampering and conspiracy to obstruct justice would require incarceration in federal prison.  Bordallo was the first woman Democrat to be elected to the Guam Legislature, and served five terms as a senator from 1981 to 1983 and again from 1987 to 1995. During the 1988 U.S. presidential election, Bordallo was a member of Guam's uncommitted delegation to the 1988 Democratic National Convention. 

Bordallo was an unsuccessful candidate for Governor of Guam in 1990, following the death of her husband. Ping Duenas ran as Bordallo's running mate for lieutenant governor in the 1990 gubernatorial election.

In 1994, she ran alongside Carl Gutierrez on the Democratic ticket and was elected Lieutenant Governor of Guam, serving from 1995 to 2003, the first woman in Guam's history to hold this position. In this role, she worked to promote tourism, environmentalism, and island beautification.

In 2002, as Bordallo reached her term limit and as Delegate Robert Underwood vacated his seat and attempted to run for governor, she campaigned for and was elected as a Democrat to the House, serving from January 2003 to January 2019, and was the first woman to represent Guam in Congress. She was one of six non-voting delegates to the House of Representatives. While in Congress, she devoted herself to economic issues and has helped to pass legislation that aids small businesses on Guam. She also was involved in military and environmental issues.

In April 2008, Bordallo apologized after an investigative report by the Pacific Daily News revealed that she and Senator Jesse Lujan both claimed to have degrees on their official biographies and resumes when they had not graduated from college.

In August 2018, Bordallo lost her bid for renomination for another term as delegate in the Democratic primary to territorial senator Michael San Nicolas.

U.S. House of Representatives

Committee assignments (2017–2019)
Committee on Armed Services
Subcommittee on Readiness (Ranking Member)
Subcommittee on Seapower and Projection Forces
Committee on Natural Resources
Subcommittee on Indian, Insular, and Alaska Native Affairs
Subcommittee on Water, Power, and Oceans

Caucus memberships (2017–2019)
Congressional Asian Pacific American Caucus (Vice Chair) 
Congressional China Caucus (Co-Chair)
United States Congressional International Conservation Caucus
Long Range Strike Caucus
United States-Philippines Friendship Caucus
Wounded to Work Caucus
U.S.-Japan Caucus
House Baltic Caucus
Congressional NextGen 9-1-1 Caucus

Legislation
Bordallo objected to amendments the United States Senate made to the Omnibus Territories Act of 2013. Originally, the bill would have included the provisions to create a fund in the U.S. treasury to pay reparation claims to "living Guam residents who were raped, injured, interned, or subjected to forced labor or marches, or internment resulting from, or incident to, such occupation and subsequent liberation; and (2) survivors of compensable residents who died in war." This provision, however, was removed from the bill. Bordallo was "extremely disappointed" by this change and said that she was "committed to continuing our fight for war claims for our manamko despite all the obstacles the conservative Republicans continue to raise." The changes were made so that the bill could pass by unanimous consent.

Elections
In January 2012, Republican Guam Senator Frank Blas Jr. announced he would challenge Bordallo in the upcoming November election for her delegate seat. Bordallo defeated Blas in the November general election. She received 19,765 votes (58%) to his 12,995 votes (38%)

In May 2012, Yale graduate and former White House intern Karlo Dizon, Democrat, also announced his bid as delegate to Congress. Bordallo defeated Dizon in the primary election, with 73% of the vote.

In 2014, she ran for delegate alongside Matthew Pascual Artero in the Democratic primary election. Bordallo defeated Artero in the primary election on August 30, 2014. Republican candidate Margaret McDonald Metcalfe announced that she would challenge Bordallo in the 2014 November election for her delegate seat.

In 2016, she was re-elected by the smallest margin, 53% to 47%, since she was first elected when she faced former Governor of Guam Felix Perez Camacho.

In the 2018 elections, Bordallo lost the Democratic primary to territorial Senator Michael San Nicolas for the delegate seat in the U.S. House of Representatives by 3.4%.

See also
 Women in the United States House of Representatives

References

External links

 Congresswoman Bordallo official U.S. House website
 

|-

|-

|-

1933 births
20th-century American politicians
20th-century American women politicians
21st-century American politicians
21st-century American women politicians
American television personalities
American women television personalities
Candidates in the 1990 United States elections
Delegates to the United States House of Representatives from Guam
Democratic Party members of the United States House of Representatives from Guam
Female members of the United States House of Representatives
First Ladies and Gentlemen of Guam
Guamanian Democrats
Guamanian women in politics
Lieutenant Governors of Guam
Living people
Members of the Legislature of Guam
People from Graceville, Minnesota
People from Tamuning, Guam
St. Catherine University alumni